Amt Lindow (Mark) is an Amt ("collective municipality") in the district of Ostprignitz-Ruppin, in Brandenburg, Germany. Its seat is in Lindow.

The Amt Lindow (Mark) consists of the following municipalities:
Herzberg
Lindow
Rüthnick
Vielitzsee

Demography

References 

Lindow
Ostprignitz-Ruppin